A list of films produced in France in 1961.

See also
 1961 in France
 1961 in French television

Notes

External links
 French films of 1961 at the Internet Movie Database
French films of 1961 at Cinema-francais.fr

1961
Films
Lists of 1961 films by country or language